The 2019 San Antonio FC season was the club's fourth season of existence. Including the San Antonio Thunder of the original NASL and the former San Antonio Scorpions of the modern NASL, this was the 10th season of professional soccer in San Antonio. The club played in the USL Championship, the second division of the United States soccer league system, and participated in the U.S. Open Cup.

Club
Coaching staff
{|class="wikitable"
|-
!Position
!Staff

|-

|-

|-

|-

|-

|-

|-Other information

|-

Squad information

First team squad

Player movement

In

Out

Loan in

Loan out

Pre-season 
The pre-season matches were announced on January 14, 2019, by SAFC.

Competitions

Overall 
Position in the Western Conference

Overview 

{| class="wikitable" style="text-align: center"
|-
!rowspan=2|Competition
!colspan=8|Record
|-
!
!
!
!
!
!
!
!
|-
| USL Championship

|-
| U.S. Open Cup

|-
! Total

USL Championship

League table

Results summary

Results by matchday 

Position in the Western Conference

Matches 
The first matches of 2019 were announced on December 14, 2018. The remaining schedule was released on December 19, 2018. Home team is listed first, left to right.

Kickoff times are in CDT (UTC−05) unless shown otherwise

Lamar Hunt U.S. Open Cup

Exhibition 
On May 31, 2019, it was announced that San Antonio would play an exhibition match against Cardiff City F.C.

Statistics

Appearances 
Discipline includes league, playoffs, and Open Cup play.

Top scorers 
The list is sorted by shirt number when total goals are equal.

Clean sheets 
The list is sorted by shirt number when total clean sheets are equal.

Summary

Awards

Player

References

San Antonio FC seasons
San Antonio
San Antonio FC
San Antonio FC